Port Carling/Lake Joseph Water Aerodrome  is located on Lake Joseph, Ontario, Canada and serves the community of Port Carling.

See also
List of airports in the Port Carling area

References

Registered aerodromes in Ontario
Seaplane bases in Ontario